Dəlləkli or Dellekli or Dellyakli may refer to:
Dəlləkli, Masally, Azerbaijan
Dəlləkli, Quba, Azerbaijan
Dəlləkli, Tovuz, Azerbaijan
Dəlləkli, Yardymli, Azerbaijan
Dəlləkli, Zangilan, Azerbaijan